Urevassnutane or Urevassnutene is a mountain in the municipality of Bykle in Agder county, Norway. The mountain sits in the Setesdalsheiene mountains and it sits on the southern shore of the lake Store Urevatn.

See also
List of mountains of Norway

References

Bykle
Mountains of Agder